Joy Springs is a small Aboriginal community, located 30 km south east of Fitzroy Crossing in the Kimberley region of Western Australia, within the Shire of Derby–West Kimberley.

Joy Springs was established in 1987, as part of the broader outstation movement. It is often referred to as Eight Mile as the Joy Springs community is located at the site of the existing windmill at 8 Mile Well, on Gogo Station.

Native title 

The community is located within the registered Gooniyandi Combined 2 (WAD6008/00) native title claim area.

Governance 

The community is managed through its incorporated body, Eight Mile (Aboriginal Corporation), incorporated under the Aboriginal Councils and Associations Act 1976 on 22 November 1988.

Town planning 

Joy Springs Layout Plan No.1 has been prepared in accordance with State Planning Policy 3.2 Aboriginal Settlements. Layout Plan No.1 was endorsed by the community on 16 October 2008 and the Western Australian Planning Commission on 13 January 2009. The Layout Plan map-set and background report can be viewed at Planning Western Australia's website.

References

External links 
 Office of the Registrar of Indigenous Corporations
 Native Title Claimant application summary

Towns in Western Australia
Aboriginal communities in Kimberley (Western Australia)